Model 3 or Tesla Model 3, is an electric vehicle.

Model 3 may also refer to:

Transportation
 MVP Model 3, an aircraft
 Pescara Model 3 Helicopter

Other uses
 Sega Model 3, arcade system board
 Smith & Wesson Model 3, a revolver
 TRS-80 Model III, a computer

See also
 Series 3 (disambiguation)